The LaFayette Place Mall is an urban shopping mall and mixed-use complex in downtown Boston. It is now named Lafayette City Center.

Creation and failure
The complex was built in 1984 on a site which had included the old R. H. White department store. R. H. White had occupied an ornate six-floor emporium there from 1876 until going out of business in 1957, after which the building was occupied by the Citymart department store (1962–1966) and Raymond's department store (1966–1972), after which the building was torn down and replaced with a parking lot and then LaFayette Place Mall in 1984.

The original developer was Mondev (Montreal Development). The project to build the mall also included an adjacent new downtown flagship store for Jordan Marsh (now Macy's). Located at the less desirable, more decayed end of the downtown shopping district (the same factor that had helped doom R. H. White, Citymart, and Raymond's, along with the continued flight of customers to suburban shopping malls), it never achieved greater than 60 percent occupancy. The interior mall had an unusual circular hallway arrangement which never became popular with shoppers. The long solid-brick facade presented a foreboding, lifeless aspect to pedestrians. It closed as a mall in 1989, ownership devolved to Chemical Bank, and the retail space remained empty for some years.

Later developments
Homart Development Company worked on redeveloping the property and reopening the mall in 1990s. Patriot Games LLC, a consortium of three companies, bought the property in 1997. Two stories were added and the complex was redeveloped as primarily office space, under the name Lafayette Corporate Center. State Street Corporation was an anchor tenant, leasing . Patriot Games sold the property in 2002 to The Abbey Group.

State Street Corporation left in the 2010s for offices in the Fort Point Channel area. With the downtown shopping area showing new signs of vitality and a burgeoning resident population nearby, Abbey Group in 2014 redeveloped the complex, revived the retail space, and rebranded the complex as Lafayette City Center.

References

External links
Layfette City Center website

1984 establishments in Massachusetts
Landmarks in Boston
Shopping malls in Massachusetts
Buildings and structures in Boston